LBCC may refer to:

Linn-Benton Community College
Long Beach City College
Longbenton Community College